Richard Hoffmann (20 April 1925 – 24 June 2021) was an American composer, musicologist and educator. He served many years as a professor at Oberlin Conservatory of Music.

Early life 

Hoffmann was born in Vienna, Austria, the son of Richard and Emanuela Hoffmann. In 1935, the family emigrated to New Zealand, where Hoffmann subsequently received a Bachelor of Music degree from the University of New Zealand in 1945.

Hoffmann went on to the USA in 1947, primarily to study composition with his cousin, Arnold Schoenberg (1948–1951). At the same time he also became Schoenberg's secretary and amanuensis.

Musical style 
About the String Trio, which was begun in 1961 (Altmünster, Austria) and, after approximately a year's interruption, completed in 1963 (Los Angeles, California) the composer wrote:

Teaching career 

Hoffmann began his career as a professor at Oberlin Conservatory of Music in 1954, where he worked until 2004. He was a visiting professor at the University of California in Berkeley from 1965 to 1966, at Victoria University in 1968, at Harvard University in 1970, at the University of Iowa in 1976 and at Vienna University in 1984.

Achievements 

Hoffmann received awards from the Fromm Music Foundation Commission in 1960 (Orchestral Piece No. 2, 1961, Universal Edition, London (1963), UE13635LW) and National Institute of Arts and Letters in 1966. Also he was given a grant from National Education Association in 1976, 1978–1979 and Fulbright Foundation in 1984–1985.

Personal life 

On December 21, 1957, Hoffmann married Joan Alfhild Flint. They have 3 children. Hoffman died in Oberlin, Ohio, on June 24, 2021, aged 96.

Compositions 

 Orchestral
Prelude and Double Fugue, strings, 1944
Violin Concerto, 1948
Orchestral Piece, 1952
Piano Concerto, 1953–54 – Mobart Music Publications/Schott
Cello Concerto, 1956–59 – Mobart Music Publications MOB 8540/Schott
Orchestral Piece [No. 2], 1961, publ. Universal Edition, London (1963), UE13635LW
Music for Strings, for solo violin and string orchestra, 1970–71 – Mobart Music Publications/Schott
Souffleur, for symphony orchestra without conductor, 1975–76
 Vocal
3 Songs (R. M. Rilke), 1948
3 Songs (Rilke), soprano, piano, 1950
2 Songs (M. Maeterlink, E. St Vincent Millay), soprano, piano, 1953–54
Mutterauge (trad.), chorus, 1956
Memento mori (grave stone inscriptions), men's 48 voices, tape, 1966–69
Les adieux (R. Hoffmann), chorus, orchestra, 1980–83
2 Poems (A. Giraud), 1 voice, flute + piccolo, bass clarinet, violin, viola, cello, piano, 1986
Lacrymosa '91 (H. Heine), chorus, orchestra, 1990
2 Songs (F. Rückert, Heine), soprano, string trio, percussion, 1990 [arr. chamber orchestra, 1991]
Die Heimkehr (G. Trakl), 1 voice, double chorus, orchestra, 1997
 Chamber and solo
String Quartet No. 1, 1947
Trio, violin, bass clarinet, piano, 1948
Duo, viola and cello, 1949 – Mobart Music Publications MOB 8550/Schott
Duo, violin and piano, 1949, rev. 1965 – Mobart Music Publications/Schott
Piano Quartet, 1950
String Quartet No. 2, 1950
Tripartita, solo violin, 1950
String Trio, 1961–63
Decadanse, for clarinet, bass clarinet, trumpet, trombone, violin, double bass, and percussion, 1972 – Mobart Music Publications/Schott
String Quartet No. 3 'on revient toujours', 1972–74 – Mobart Music Publications/Schott
Changes, for two sets of chimes, four players, 1974 – Mobart Music Publications/Schott
Notturno [String Quartet No. 5], double string quartet, 1995
String Quartet No. 6 'Anbruch–Einbruch–Abbruch', 1999
 Keyboard
Piano Sonata, 1945–46
3 Small Pieces, piano, 1947
Fantasy and Fugue in Memoriam Arnold Schoenberg, organ, 1951 – Mobart Music Publications/Schott
Variations No. 1, piano, 1951
Sonatina, piano, 1952
Passacaglia, organ, 1953 - Mobart Music Publications/Schott
Variations No. 2, piano, 1959 – Mobart Music Publications MOB 8585/Schott
MONO/POLY, piano, 1994 (first performance Pasadena, 13 September 1994, by Leonard Stein
 Electroacoustic
In memoriam patris, tape, 1976
String Quartet No. 4 '(scordatura – trompe l'oreille)', string quartet, computer, 1977–78

Writings 
 Hoffmann, Richard, "Webern: Six Pieces, op. 6, 1909", Perspectives of New Music 6 (1967–68)
 Schoenberg, Arnold, Von heute auf morgen, Op. 32, edited by Richard Hoffmann, with Werner Bittinger. Mainz: B. Schott's Söhne; Wien: Universal Edition, 1970.

References

Further reading 
 Feisst, Sabine, Schoenberg's New World: The American Years, Oxford, Oxford University Press: 2011, p. 332 n.10
 Markus Grassl and Reinhard Kapp, Die Lehre von der musikalischen Aufführung in der Wiener Schule (Wiener Veröffentlichungen zur Musikgeschichte, vol. 3), Böhlau Wien, 2002, 685–686
 Alec Leshy, "OCME honors Richard Hoffman", The Oberlin Review, vol. 128, no. 12, December 10, 1999
 Waleson, Heidi, "Making it New", Oberlin Conservatory Magazine, 2009–10
 Woodard, Josef, "Music Review: Stein in Triumphant Reading of Schoenberg in Pasadena", Los Angeles Times, September 16, 1994 (review of premiere of MONO/POLY)

1925 births
2021 deaths
American male composers
20th-century American composers
20th-century American male musicians
Musicians from Vienna
Austrian emigrants to the United States
University of New Zealand alumni
University of California, Los Angeles alumni
University of California, Los Angeles faculty
Oberlin Conservatory of Music faculty